City of Silent Men is a 1942 American crime film directed by William Nigh and written by Joseph Hoffman. The film stars Frank Albertson, June Lang, Jan Wiley, Richard Clarke, William Gould and Emmett Lynn. The film was released on October 12, 1942, by Producers Releasing Corporation.

Plot

Cast      
Frank Albertson as Gil Davis
June Lang as Helen Hendricks
Jan Wiley as Jane Muller
Richard Clarke as Jerry Hendricks
William Gould as Mayor Hendricks
Emmett Lynn as Jeb Parker
Dick Curtis as Frank Muller
Barton Hepburn as Frank
Frank Jaquet as Judge
Frank Ferguson as Fred Bernard
Richard Bailey as Liptine
Jack Baxley as Police Chief
William Kellogg as Police Captain
Charles Jordan as Gordon
Pat Gleason as Manners

References

External links
 

1942 films
1940s English-language films
American crime films
1942 crime films
Producers Releasing Corporation films
Films directed by William Nigh
American black-and-white films
1940s American films